was a Japanese magazine editor and photography critic.

Nishii was born in Tokyo in 1946. He graduated in economics from Keio University in 1968, and shortly after this moved to the company publishing Mainichi Shimbun, rising via stints at Sunday Mainichi and Mainich Graph to become editor in chief of Camera Mainichi from 1983 until the magazine folded in 1985. After the demise of Camera Mainichi Nishii worked as an editor for various book-publishing projects of Mainichi Shinbun-sha. Nishii first proposed the Society of Photography Award and played a major role in setting it up.

Books by Nishii

Hizuke no aru shashinron. Tokyo: Seikyūsha, 1981. 
Shashin to iu media (The medium called photographs). Tokyo: Tōjunsha, 1982. 
Shōwa 20-nen Tōkyō chizu (A map of Tokyo, 1945–50). Tokyo: Chikuma Shobō, 1986. . 
Shōwa 20-nen Tōkyō chizu: zoku (A map of Tokyo, 1945–50, continued). Tokyo: Chikuma Shobō, 1987. . 
Kurayami no ressun. Tokyo: Misuzu Shobō, 1992. . 
Sengo 50-nen (Fifty years after the war). Tokyo: Mainichi Shinbunsha, 1995. 
Distance: Eiga o meguru danshō. Tokyo: Kage Shobō, 1996. . 
Shashinteki kioku (Photographic memories). Tokyo: Seikyūsha, 1997. . 
Shashin no yosoyososhisa. Tokyo: Misuzu Shobō, 1996. . 
Naze imada "Purovōku" ka. Tokyo: Seikyūsha, 1996. . 
20-seki shashinron: Shūshō. Tokyo: Seikyūsha, 2001. . 
Daido Moriyama. Phaidon 55. London: Phaidon, 2001. . 
Shashin-henshūsha: Yamagishi Shōji e no omāju (Photo editor: A homage to Shōji Yamagishi). Tokyo: Mado-sha, 2002. .

Notes

External links
Nishii text archive at the Society of Photography (Tokyo) 
Potted biography for the 13th Nihon no moji to kumihan o kangaeru kai  seminar held on 18 April 1999.

1946 births
2001 deaths
People from Tokyo
Photography critics
Photography in Japan
Japanese writers
Japanese magazine editors
Keio University alumni